Lila María Mercedes Mayoral Wirshing  (12 May 1942 – 7 January 2003) was the wife of the Governor of Puerto Rico Rafael Hernández Colón, and was First Lady during his three terms as governor (1973–1977, 1985–1993).

Early years and marriage
Lila María Mercedes Mayoral Wirshing was born in Ponce, Puerto Rico, in 1942. Her parents were Juan Eugenio Mayoral Renovales (1906–1967), an industrialist, founder and president of Ponce Candy Industries, and Julita Wirshing Serrallés. Her paternal grandparents were Joaquin Mayoral Montalvo (1878–1911), who was born and died in Ponce, and Maria Renovales Rodriguez (1879–1964), who was born in Ponce and died in Caracas, Venezuela. She was the second of four sisters: Julita Mercedes, Ana Inés and Eugenia. She began her studies at the Liceo Ponceño in Ponce, and finished high school at the Dana Hall School in Wellesley, Massachusetts. 

During this time she met Rafael Hernández Colón, who was a young law student. Mayoral Wirshing and Hernández Colón married on 24 October 1959. They had four children: Rafael, José Alfredo, Dora Mercedes and Juan Eugenio.

First Lady of Puerto Rico: 1973–1977
Lila Mayoral became First Lady of Puerto Rico when her husband was elected Governor in the 1972 general elections. She remained in the position until he lost the 1976 elections. As first lady, she distinguished herself for her dedication to the community. For example, after Hurricane Eloise caused significant damage in Puerto Rico, Mayoral organized a benefit concert to aid those affected by the storm.

Return to private life and college: 1977–1984
After her husband was defeated in his bid for another term in La Fortaleza, Mayoral Wirshing returned to college to finish her degree. She received a bachelor's degree in business management from the Universidad del Sagrado Corazón in 1982, graduating summa cum laude with a 4.00 GPA.

Return to La Fortaleza: 1985–1993
Mayoral became the First Lady again when Hernández Colón was re-elected in 1984. The next year, after the Mameyes Landslide in Ponce, Mayoral convinced the government to build concrete homes for the victims instead of relocating them into new wood-frame homes. Also, after Hurricane Hugo affected the island, Mayoral acted as liaison between the government and the community to synchronize fund-raising efforts to help the victims of that storm. She was president of the board of directors of Dale la Mano a Puerto Rico, a public-private partnership that organized a marathon which raised $15.6 million in help funds.

Mayoral led a school anti-drug campaign called "Abre tus ojos a un mundo sin drogas" (Open your eyes to a world without drugs). The campaign encouraged students to create artwork that revolved around anti-drug themes. Several celebrities, including José Miguel Agrelot, Ednita Nazario and Dagmar participated in the campaign, giving awards and gifts to the winners. She also led reforestation efforts in the island, particularly along roadways and in schools.

Later years and death
After her retirement from public life, Mayoral continued working on several projects, including Centro San Francisco in Ponce and the construction of a sanctuary for the Virgin Mary (Lumen Dei Union) in Orocovis. Mayoral died on 7 January 2003, aged 61, of colon cancer. She was interred at Cementerio Católico San Vicente de Paul in Ponce.

Accolades
A school in Barrio Canas, Sector El Tuque in Ponce was named in her honor. The building housing the headquarters of the Puerto Rico Department of Family Affairs in San Juan, Puerto Rico, is also named after her.

Honors and awards
Mayoral received numerous awards and honors during her lifetime, including:
 1971: Young Mother of the Year
 1973: Woman of the Year, receiving the plaque from Mayor of New York City John Lindsay
 1975: Distinguished Woman from the Chamber of Commerce
 1985: Honorary Member of the Commission of Businesswomen
 1987: Recognition from the Philadelphia Council of Hispanic Organizations
 1990: Recognition from the Federal Emergency Management Agency for her efforts after Hurricane Hugo
 1991: Honorary Member of the Westchester Hispanic Chamber of Commerce, Inc.
 1992: Honorary Doctorate in Social Work from University of Aruba

See also

 List of Puerto Ricans
 German immigration to Puerto Rico

References

|-

1942 births
2003 deaths
Deaths from colorectal cancer
First Ladies and Gentlemen of Puerto Rico
Puerto Rican people of German descent
Puerto Rican people of Spanish descent
Puerto Rican Roman Catholics
People from Ponce, Puerto Rico
Burials at Cementerio Católico San Vicente de Paul
Dana Hall School alumni
Universidad del Sagrado Corazón alumni